Thaddeus Franklin Brown (December 7, 1902 - October 9, 1970) was the police chief of the Los Angeles Police Department from July 18, 1966 to February 17, 1967. Brown, who was the LAPD's Chief of Detectives, was appointed police chief on July 18, 1966, following Chief William H. Parker's death on July 16, 1966. Brown was succeeded by Thomas Reddin on February 17, 1967. His brother, Finis Brown, was also on the LAPD, and was one of the noteworthy police officers who investigated the Elizabeth Short murder, also known as the Black Dahlia murder.

Early life
Thad F. Brown was born in Missouri and lived there until his early twenties. At 15, he quit school to work for 17 1/2 cents an hour in the lead and zinc mines near Joplin, Missouri. Four years later, now a married man, he moved to California. Brown soon applied for the LAPD and became an officer on January 11, 1926. Brown's badge number is 869.

Police career
Brown investigated many high profile cases and their suspects, including L. Ewing Scott, Albert Dyer, William Edward "The Fox" Hickman, as well as Elizabeth Short's murder.

Portrayal in media
In James Ellroy's 2014 novel, Perfidia, a fictionalized version of Thad Brown is portrayed as a supporting character.
Brown's name was frequently mentioned on Dragnet in the early years, especially on the radio program: Detective Joe Friday's self-introduction would include "the boss is Thad Brown, chief of detectives."  Brown also makes an uncredited cameo as himself in the 1954 film. In season one episode 1 of Dragnet aired in December 1951, Thad Brown was portrayed by Raymond Burr.

With Brown’s approval, this speech was put into his mouth by Dragnet creator Jack Webb for an episode of the show that dealt with police corruption. It was often reprinted in newspapers, and read at police academies at the time:

External links
http://www.lmharnisch.com/thad_brown.html retrieved November 20, 2014
 retrieved November 20, 2014

Further reading
Hodel, Steve. The Black Dahlia Avenger: The True Story, Arcade Publishing, 2003, 
Hodel, Steve. Black Dahlia Avenger: A Genius for Murder, Harper Perennial, 2004, 
Hodel, Steve. Black Dahlia Avenger II: Presenting the Follow-Up Investigation and Further Evidence Linking Dr. George Hill Hodel to Los Angeles's Black Dahlia and other 1940s- LONE WOMAN MURDERS, Thoughtprint Press, 2012, 
Hodel, Steve. Black Dahlia Avenger II 2014: Presenting the Follow-Up Investigation and Further Evidence Linking Dr. George Hill Hodel to Los Angeles's Black Dahlia and other 1940s Lone Woman Murders, Thoughtprint Press, 2014, 

1902 births
1970 deaths
Chiefs of the Los Angeles Police Department
People from Los Angeles